Schomburgkia was a genus of plants belonging to the family Orchidaceae. This genus was named for Richard Schomburgk, a German botanist who explored British Guiana during the 19th century. Former species of this genus were either epiphytic or lithophytic in their growth habit. According to the Royal Horticultural Society Schom. was the official abbreviation for this genus.

The genus was named in 1838 by Lindley, with Schomburgkia crispa, a large sized, hot growing plant found in the tropical areas of Venezuela, Suriname, Brazil, Colombia and Ecuador, as the type species.  In 1941, Schom. crispa was moved to the genus Laelia by L.O.Williams.  Its accepted name is now Laelia marginata.  The member species of Schomburgkia have since been moved to different genera:  Myrmecophila, Laelia, and Pseudolaelia.

Former species
Schomburgkia albopurpurea (W.H.W.Strachan ex Fawc.) Withner 1993, Grand Cayman Island, now Myrmecophila albopurpurea (W.H.W.Strachan ex Fawc.) Nir 2000
Schomburgkia brysiana Lem 1851, now Myrmecophila brysiana (Lem.) G.C.Kenn 1979
Schomburgkia crispa Lindl. 1838 (Brazil) : type species, now known as Laelia marginata
Schomburgkia elata Schltr. 1924, now Laelia elata (Schltr.) J.M.H.Shaw 2009
Schomburgkia exaltata  Kraenzl., Central America, 1926,  now Myrmecophila exaltata  (Kraenzl.) G.C. Kenn. 1979
Schomburgkia galeottiana A.Rich. 1845, now Myrmecophila galeottiana (A.Rich.) [Rolfe] 1917
Schomburgkia gloriosa Rchb.f. 1860, now Laelia gloriosa (Rchb.f.) L.O.Williams 1941
Schomburgkia grandiflora (Lindl.) Sander 1901, now Myrmecophila grandiflora (Lindl.)  & J.L.Tapia & I.Ramirez 2001
Schomburgkia heidii  1982, now Laelia heidii (Carnevali) Van den Berg 2004
Schomburgkia humboldtii  (Rchb.f) Rchb.f. 1856, Central America, now Myrmecophila humboldtii  (Rchb.f) Rolfe 1917
Schomburgkia lueddemannii Prill. 1862, now Laelia lueddemannii (Prill.) L.O.Williams 1940
Schomburgkia lyonsii Lindl. 1853, now Laelia lyonsii (Lindl.) L.O.Williams 1941
Schomburgkia marginata Lindl. 1838, now Laelia marginata (Lindl.) L.O.Williams 1941
Schomburgkia moyobambae Schltr. 1921, now Laelia moyobambae (Schltr.) C.Schweinf. 1944
Schomburgkia rosea Linden ex Lindl. 1845 (Colombia), now Laelia rosea (Linden ex Lindl.) C.Schweinf. 1967
Schomburgkia schultzei Schltr. 1924, now Laelia schultzei (Schltr.) J.M.H.Shaw 2008
Schomburgkia splendida Schltr. 1913, now Laelia splendida (Schltr.) L.O.Williams 1941
Schomburgkia superbiens (Lindl.) Rolfe 1917, now Laelia superbiens Lindl. 1840
Schomburgkia thomsoniana  Rchb.f 1887, Cayman Islands, now Myrmecophila thomsoniana  (Rchb.f) Rolfe 1917
Schomburgkia thomsoniana var. atropurpurea Hook.f. 1902, Grand Cayman, now Myrmecophila thomsoniana var thomsoniana
Schomburgkia thomsoniana var. minor Hook.f. 1902 nom. illeg., now Myrmecophila thomsoniana var. minor (W.H.W.Strachan ex Fawc.) Dressler 2003
Schomburgkia tibicinis  (Bateman ex Lindl.) Bateman 1841, Central America, now Myrmecophila tibicinis  (Bateman ex Lindl.) Rolfe 1917
Schomburgkia undulata Lindl. 1844 Costa Rica to Trinidad, now Laelia undulata (Lindl.) L.O.Williams 1941
Schomburgkia vellozicola Hoehne 1933 SE Brazil, now Pseudolaelia vellozicola (Hoehne) Porto & Brade 1935
Schomburgkia wallisii Rchb.f. 1877 Columbia, now Laelia colombiana J.M.H.Shaw 2008
Schomburgkia weberbaueriana Kraenzlin 1906 (Bolivia; Peru), now Laelia weberbaueriana (Kraenzl.) C.Schweinf. 1944
Schomburgkia wendlandii (Rchb.f.) H.G.Jones 1961 , Central America, now Myrmecophila wendlandii (Rchb.f.) G.C.Kenn. 1979

See also
Laelia
Myrmecophila - a very near genus
Pseudolaelia

References

Missouri Botanical Garden w3 TROPICOS
The World Checklist of Monocotyledons
AOS article, including the taxonomic change for this genus

External links
Royal Horticultural Society: Registration of Orchids

Laeliinae genera
Epiphytic orchids
Historically recognized angiosperm genera
Laeliinae